Consumables (also known as consumable goods, non-durable goods, or soft goods) are goods that are intended to be consumed. People have, for example, always consumed food and water. Consumables are in contrast to durable goods. Disposable products are a particular, extreme case of consumables, because their end-of-life is reached after a single use.

Consumables are products that consumers use recurrently, i.e., items which "get used up" or discarded. For example consumable office supplies are such products as paper, pens, file folders, Post-it notes, and toner or ink cartridges. This is in contrast to capital goods or durable goods in the office, such as computers, fax machines, and other business machines or office furniture. Sometimes a company sells a durable good at an attractively low price in the hopes that the consumer will then buy the consumables that go with it at a price providing a higher margin. Printers and ink cartridges are an example, as are cameras and film as well as razors and blades, which gave this business model its usual name (the razor and blades model).

Printing Consumables is another term used for office supplies. These are the consumable components like toner cartridges, they are consumed, utilized and then exhausted. These supplies are considered to be a major element of printing process.

For arc welding one uses a consumable electrode. This is an electrode that conducts electricity to the arc but also melts into the weld as a filler metal.

Consumable goods are often excluded from warranty policies, as it is considered that covering them would excessively increase the cost of the premium.

See also
 Durability
 Durable good
 Fast-moving consumer goods
 Principles of Intelligent Urbanism
 Repairable component

References

External links
 Defining consumable relative to waste

Environmental design
Goods (economics)